Ballacolla, officially Ballycolla, is a village in County Laois, Ireland.

As of the 2016 census, Ballacolla had a population of 136 people.

References

See also
 List of towns and villages in Ireland

Towns and villages in County Laois
Townlands of County Laois